Ars Nova is a Polish early music instrumental ensemble founded in Warsaw in 1981 by .

The instrumental ensemble has cooperated with other Polish early music ensembles such as Il Canto, Collegium Vocale Bydgoszcz, and others.

Discography
 Musique a la chapelle des Jagiellons, works by Mikołaj z Radomia and Jan z Jasiennej. Ars Nova 1990, Accord (French record label), Paris
 Piotr of Grudziądz Petrus de Grudziądz Chansons et Motets, Bornus Consort, Ars Nova, 1991, Accord, Paris
 El Llibre Vermell, 1991, JAM, Warsaw
 Mikołaj z Radomia, 1995, DUX, Warsaw (nominated for Fryderyk 1995)
 Muzyka na Wawelu, Music On Wawel Castle - Ars Nova, Urbaniak. 1995, DUX, Warsaw (nominated for Fryderyk 1995)
 Zaświeć niesiundzu, 1996, DUX, Warsaw
 Mikołaj Gomółka Melodie na psałterz polski. Psalms settings on psalm paraphrases of Jan Kochanowski, 1996, DUX, Warsaw (winner of the Fryderyk 1996)
 W Dzień Bożego Narodzenia, soloist Łucja Prus, 1996, Polnet, Warsaw
 Millenium Sancti Adalberti-Wojciechi, 1997, Polskie Radio, Warsaw
 Bogurodzica - hymns sequences and polyphonic music of the Polish Middle Ages, Anna Mikolajczyk (soprano), Robert Lawaty (counter-tenor), Cezary Szyfman (baritone) Ars Nova, Jacek Urbaniak 1997, Tonpress, Warsaw
 Pieśni sefardyjskie, Sephardic songs, soloist J. T. Stępień, 1997, ZPR Records, Warsaw
 Romantyczność - w 150. rocznicę śmierci Adama Mickiewicza, 1998, Radio Białystok, DUX
 Andrzej Hiolski śpiewa kolędy, :pl:Andrzej Hiolski sings carols 1998, Silva Rerum, Warsaw
 Muzyka Jagiellonów - rękopis Krasińskich XV w., 2001, Travers, Warsaw
 Anatomia Kobyły - Anatomy of a Mare - popular songs about horses, 2002, Travers, Warszawa (Nominated Fryderyk 2003)
 Muzyka Piastów Śląskich XIII-XV w., Music of the Silesian Piasts 2004, Travers, Warsaw
 Rudolphina - skarby Legnicy XVI/XVII w., Treasures of Legnica; composers including Hassler, Ars Nova, Subtilior Ensemble and Urbaniak 2004, DUX, Warsaw
 Jezusa Judasz przedał - Polish passion play music, with Collegium Vocale Bydgoszcz 2004, DUX, Warsaw
 Cornelis Schuyt: Renaissance dances of the Netherlands, 1611, 2004, Travers, Warszawa
 Muzyka Polskiego Średniowiecza, 2006  Travers, Warsaw
 Muzyka Polskiego Renesansu, 2007 Travers, Warsaw
 O cudownych uzdrowieniach Of miraculous healings, Cantigas de Santa Maria, estampies, 2008 Travers, Warsaw
 Sebastian Klonowic: Hebdomas 10 songs. 2010 (CD attached to book) Neriton, Warsaw 
 Tabulatura Warszawskiego Towarzystwa Muzycznego  (zwana też tabulaturą łowicką) 16th century, 2010 Travers, Warsaw
 Cyprian Bazylik: complete works, 2012 Travers, Sieradzkie Centrum Kultury, 2014 Acte Prealable

References

External links
 Ars Nova zespół instrumentów dawnych

Early music groups
Musical groups established in 1981
1981 establishments in Poland
Polish musical groups